The Coral Sea Marine Park (previously known as the Coral Sea Commonwealth Marine Reserve) is an Australian marine park located in the Coral Sea off the coast of Queensland. It is Australia's largest single marine park and together with the French Natural Park of the Coral Sea form the largest protected area in the World.

The Coral Sea Marine Park lies directly adjacent to and east of the Great Barrier Reef Marine Park.

Conservation values

Species and habitat
Humpback whales during their annual migration along the east coast of Australia;
Nesting and inter-nesting sites for green turtles;
Breeding and foraging areas for multiple seabird species including noddies, terns, boobies, frigatebirds, and tropic birds;
White shark distribution and whale shark aggregation.
Transient populations of highly migratory pelagic species, including small fish schools, billfish, tuna and sharks.
The East Australian Current forms in the region and is considered a major pathway for mobile predators such as billfish and tunas. Black marlin undergo seasonal movements into the Queensland Plateau area.

Bioregions and other features
Includes three Key Ecological Features: the reefs, cays and herbivorous fish of the Queensland Plateau and the Marion Plateau and the northern extent of the Tasmantid Seamount Chain.
Heritage values include several historic shipwrecks including three World War II shipwrecks from the Battle of the Coral Sea.
The reserve represents the full range of seafloor features found in the region, including numerous reefs ranging from Ashmore and Boot Reefs in the north of the region to Cato Island and surrounding reefs in the south. The reserve includes canyons, troughs and plateaux, including Bligh Canyon approximately 200 kilometres off the coast from Lockhart River and the Townsville Trough, which separates the Queensland and Marion Plateaux. The reserve extends into the deeper waters of the Coral Sea Basin in the north, and provides protection for the pinnacles of the northern extent of the Tasmantid seamount chain.
Six provincial bioregions, 94 depth ranges, and 16 seafloor types are represented in the reserve.

History
The Coral Sea Commonwealth Marine Reserve was proclaimed in December 2013, and renamed as a 'Marine Park' in October 2017.

The original management plan for the Coral Sea Marine Park was suspended before it came into effect on 1 July 2014. The plans, which cover the zoning and protection measures of the marine park, were later subject to review as part of a wider review into the Commonwealth Marine Reserves announced in 2012.

On 1 July 2018 the management plan and protection measures came into effect for the first time. Under the new management plan, 'no take' zones in the marine park were reduced in area by approximately 53% compared to the original proposed zoning.

Former reserves
The Coral Sea Marine Park encompasses the former Coral Sea Conservation Zone, former Coringa-Herald National Nature Reserve and former Lihou Reef National Nature Reserve.

Summary of protection zones
The Coral Sea Marine Park has been assigned IUCN protected area category IV. However, within the marine park there are multiple protection zones, each zone has an IUCN category and related rules for managing activities to ensure the protection of marine habitats and species.

The following table is a summary of the zoning rules within the Coral Sea Marine Park:

See also

 Protected areas managed by the Australian government
 Great Barrier Reef Marine Park

References

External links
 Coral Sea Marine Park - Parks Australia
 Coral Sea Marine Park - environment.gov.au (outdated)

Australian marine parks